Mount Denver is a  mountain summit located in the Valhalla Ranges of the Selkirk Mountains in southeast British Columbia, Canada. The mountain takes its name from New Denver, which in turn is named after Denver, Colorado. This mountain's name was officially adopted March 31, 1924, by the Geographical Names Board of Canada.

Based on the Köppen climate classification, Mount Denver has a subarctic climate with cold, snowy winters, and mild summers.

See also
Geography of British Columbia

References

External links

 Weather forecast: Mount Denver  

Two-thousanders of British Columbia
Selkirk Mountains
Kootenay Land District